was a Japanese middle distance runner who competed in the 1964 Summer Olympics. His daughter Tsuru Morimoto is a former footballer who played for the Japanese national team.

References

1939 births
2021 deaths
Japanese male middle-distance runners
Olympic athletes of Japan
Athletes (track and field) at the 1964 Summer Olympics
Asian Games medalists in athletics (track and field)
Athletes (track and field) at the 1962 Asian Games
Athletes (track and field) at the 1966 Asian Games
Universiade medalists in athletics (track and field)
Asian Games gold medalists for Japan
Asian Games bronze medalists for Japan
Medalists at the 1962 Asian Games
Medalists at the 1966 Asian Games
Universiade gold medalists for Japan
Medalists at the 1963 Summer Universiade
20th-century Japanese people